Julian David Rhodes (born 20 March 1969) was the chairman of English League One football side Bradford City. He has been chairman since December 2004, after taking the club out of administration. In 2007, he became joint-chairman with Mark Lawn. Julian Rhodes sold the club in 2016 to German owners Edin Rahic and Stefan Rupp. But returned to the club in 2018 as a consulty role.

He was born in Bradford and studied at Huddersfield Polytechnic.

He  played lead guitar for the Heavy Metal band Pegasus between 1983–1985 with Eggy Watson (drums), Ant Smith (rhythm guitar) & Micky Rowbottom (vocals).

References

1969 births
Living people
Businesspeople from Bradford
Alumni of the University of Huddersfield
Bradford City A.F.C. directors and chairmen